Pyaar Ko Ho Jaane Do (Let Love Happen) is an Indian soap opera that premiered on 20 October 2015. It was aired Monday through Friday at 9pm on Sony Entertainment Television India. The show stars Iqbal Khan and Mona Singh as the protagonists. The show is produced by Ekta Kapoor under her banner Balaji Telefilms. The show marks the comeback of various television actors. Due to low TRPs, the show aired its final episode on 29 January 2016.

Plot

The show is the story of a very well-to-do, modern Punjabi family, the Hoodas. The backbone of this loving family is Ishaan (Mohammed Iqbal Khan) and his wife Preet (Mona Singh). Though Ishaan is Mr Hooda’s brother’s son, he (Mr Hooda) and his wife accepted Ishaan with open arms when the latter lost his entire family, including his wife, in a tragedy. Ishaan then went on to marry Preet, who too lost her family. Ishaan is the perfect son, the best brother, a doting father and an excellent friend. But underneath his perfect facade lies a terrible truth that Ishaan has been hiding from everyone, the truth about his real identity. Ishaan has constantly been in touch with a girl which led to the belief that he has an extra marital affair. The truth, however, is much further away from that. Ishaan, in fact, is a spy from a neighbouring country Pakistan, Rizwaan Ahmed Khan, who is brainwashed into thinking that his parents were killed by Indian agents.

The real Ishaan died, like the rest of his family, in the same tragedy. Given that Mr Hooda had not seen his brother or his family in years because of a clash the two had, there was no way they would have known what their nephew looked like. Using this to their advantage, the enemy IA sent their spy posing as Ishaan.
Ishaan/Rizwan and Preet put up a facade of being a happy married couple while doting on the real Ishaan's daughter Kavya (who survived the tragedy). Ishaan and Preet are gradually drawn to each other during the four years of their marriage. Rizwan aka Ishaan tries to fight his attraction to Preet but eventually consummates his marriage with her. By the time Preet discovers Rizwan's truth, she realizes she is pregnant with his child. Eventually, she takes the help of a RAW agent called Shergill to try to stop Rizwan. On 26 January, before Rizwan can complete his mission, Preet tells him Baba's truth with the help of Sana. They hug each other and die in the bomb blast. Later a grown up Kavya writes a book named A Tale of Two Countries which was based on the story of Riwzan-Preet.

Cast
 Mohammed Iqbal Khan as Rizwan Ahmed Khan/Ishaan Hooda (male lead, grey shaded)
 Mona Singh as Preet Ishaan Hooda (née Singh)/Preet Rizwan Khan (female lead & protagonist)
 Micky Makhija as Amardeep Hooda
 Jyothi D Tommaar as Alka Hooda
 Mansi Sharma as Trisha Hooda
 Pushtiie Shakti as Neeti Khurana (née Hooda)
 Lavin Gothi as Siddharth "Sid" Hooda
 Melanie Pais as Sana (antagonist/later turned protagonist)
 Mohit Abrol as Atif
 Parag Tyagi as Kiku Khurana
 Arjit Taneja as Bilal Khan
 Hayat Asif as Baba (main antagonist)
 Arun Bali as Ustad Rehmat Ali Khan
 Shikha Singh as Shabina Khan
 Aryan Bhatia as Tinku Khurana
 Mahesh Shetty as Raw Agent Jai Shergill
 Amit Dolawat as Vikrant
 Shiny Dixit as Naina

References

External links
 Official website
 SonyLIV site

Balaji Telefilms television series
Sony Entertainment Television original programming
2015 Indian television series debuts
2016 Indian television series endings
Hindi-language television shows